Luis Rodriguez may refer to:


Arts and entertainment
Luis Rodríguez (producer) (born 1948), Spanish record producer based in Germany
Luis J. Rodriguez (born 1954), American poet and novelist
Luis Rodríguez (born 1978), Puerto Rican singer and songwriter known professionally as Luis Fonsi
Luis Rodriguez, a human character on Sesame Street, played by Emilio Delgado

Sports

Association football (soccer)
Luisín Rodríguez (1910–1990) Spanish footballer, player and manager of CD Logroñés
Luis Rodríguez (Chilean footballer) (born 1961)
Luis Rodriguez de la Rosa (born 1979), referee in the 2009–10 CONCACAF Champions League Group Stage 
Luis Rodríguez (Guatemalan footballer) (born 1982), Guatemalan football player
Luis Antonio Rodríguez (born 1985), Argentine football player
Luis Sánchez Rodríguez (born 1988), Mexican footballer
Luis Alfonso Rodríguez (born 1991), Mexican football player
Luis Eduardo Rodríguez (born 1991), Mexican football player
Luis Rodríguez (born 1992), member of the Costa Rican team in the 2009 FIFA under-17 world cup
Luis Rodríguez (Bolivian footballer) (born 1994), Bolivian football left-back
Luis Rodríguez (Colombian footballer) (born 1995)

Other sports
Luis Rodriguez Olmo, (1919-2017), Puerto Rican baseball player
Luis Manuel Rodríguez (1937–1996), Cuban boxer
Luis Rodríguez (Venezuelan boxer) (born 1947), Venezuelan boxer
Luis Rodríguez (athlete) (born 1966), Spanish athlete
Luis Rodríguez (volleyball) (born 1969), Puerto Rican volleyball player
Luis Rodríguez (baseball) (born 1980), Venezuelan baseball player

Other 
Luis Orlando Rodríguez (1912–1989), Cuban journalist, politician and interior minister and the first commentator of Radio Rebelde
Luis Rodríguez (astronomer) (born 1948), Mexican astronomer, member of the Colegio Nacional

See also 
Luis Miguel Rodríguez (disambiguation)
José Luis Rodríguez (disambiguation)